Glåmdalen is a local newspaper published in Kongsvinger, Norway. It is named after the district Glåmdalen, and covers southern Hedmark with offices in Solør, Skarnes and Nes, Akershus.

History and profile
The newspaper was established in 1926 as Kongsvinger Arbeiderblad, and had a connection to the Norwegian Labour Party. It changed its name in 1943, and later became non-partisan. Glåmdalen changed to tabloid format in 1997 and launched its Internet site in 2000.

Glåmdalen is published by the company Glåmdalen AS, which is owned 100% by Amedia. In 2011, the paper won the World Young Reader Prize of WAN/IFRA in the Public Service category.

In a study dated 2016 Glåmdalen was found to contain the epithet Negro (Norwegian: neger) at the lowest frequency in the period between 1970 and 2014 with 14 references.

Glåmdalen had a circulation of 18,531 in 2010. The 2013 circulation of the paper was 16,523 copies. Next year it sold 15,4244 copies.

References

External links

Further reading

1926 establishments in Norway
Daily newspapers published in Norway
Labour Party (Norway) newspapers
Mass media in Kongsvinger
Norwegian-language newspapers
Publications established in 1926